Shivani Verma (born 31 May 1972), better known as BK Shivani, is a teacher in the Brahma Kumaris spiritual movement of India.

Early life
BK Shivani's parents began following the Brahma Kumaris when she was a child. She began to attend meetings in her early 20s.

She completed her undergraduate  in electronics engineering at the Savitribai Phule Pune University where she was an academic gold medalist, and completed a master's degree in computer engineering from the Maharashtra Institute of Technology. Initially, she worked backstage at the production of Brahma Kumaris television presentations in Delhi, where senior teachers would record the teachings. In 2007, due to the unavailability of other teachers, she was asked to start answering the viewers' queries herself.

In 2007, a pay-to-broadcast television series Awakening with Brahma Kumaris was produced for the Aastha channel in which BK Shivani was interviewed by co-host Kanu Priya.

Her TV series of conversations with Suresh Oberoi was adapted into the 2015 book Happiness Unlimited: Awakening With Brahma Kumaris.

BK Shivani travels in India and abroad, appearing at charitable events ranging from the promotion of organ donation to parenting programs, as well as Brahma Kumaris events. In 2017 she was named as a goodwill ambassador of the World Psychiatric Association.

Awards and recognitions
BK Shivani received the Women of the Decade Achievers Award by ASSOCHAM Ladies League in 2014 and the Nari Shakti Award in March 2019.

References

20th-century Indian educators
1972 births
Living people
Brahma Kumaris
Indian spiritual teachers
Savitribai Phule Pune University alumni
Indian motivational speakers
Indian women television presenters
Indian television presenters
Educators from Maharashtra
Women educators from Maharashtra
Women motivational speakers
20th-century women educators